Zoogodô Bogum Malê Rundó, also known as the Terreiro do Bogum, is a Candomblé terreiro in Salvador, Bahia, Brazil. It is located high in the Engenho Velho da Federação, or simply Federação neighborhood of Salvador on Ladeira do Bogum, a narrow street, formerly known as Ladeira Manoel do Bonfim. It is an area long associated with residents of Kingdom of Dahomey descent.

The terreiro is associated with the Jejé branch of the religion; it is both the first and last remaining Jejé terreiro in the region. It differs from other Candomblé terreiros of the Salvador region in its use of the Ewe language of present-day Benin, in contrast to the widespread use of Yoruba in other temples. The temple uses the term vodun for its deities in place of the more common orixás; it is one of its numerous similarities to Haitian Vodou. The Bogum community closely related to Jejé temples in Cachoeira, a small city in the Recôncavo Baiano in the interior of Bahia. The Zoogodô Bogum Malê Seja Undé (Roça do Ventura) terreiro in Cachoeira shares a lineage with Zoogodô Bogum Malê Rundó.

Location

Zoogodô Bogum Malê Rundó is located in Engenho Velho da Federação on Ladeira do Bogum. It is located southeast in close proximity to Terreiro Ilê Aché Ibá Ogum; and further southeast Terreiro de Candomblé Ilê Axé Oxumaré, better known as Terreiro Casa Branca.

History

Zoogodô Bogum Malê Rundó was founded either in 1835 or 1858 and formally incorporated in 1937 as the Sociedade Beneficente Fieis de Sao Bartolomeu. The location of the terreiro is where Joaquim Jêje, a hero of the Malê revolt of 1835, left a bogum, or chest where the donations could support the movement. The term bogum is a combination of the words igbo ("lugar") and gun ("Fon"). The term originates from the Gun dialect of the Porto Novo, Benin, a dialect of the Fon language that utilizes many elements of Yoruba. The terreiro was led by Africans until the death of Mãe de Santo Valentina (Maria Valentina dos Anjos Costa) in 1975; she remained fluent in the Fon language throughout her life.

Relationship to Zoogodô Bogum Malê Seja Undé

Zoogodô Bogum Malê Rundó shares a common history with Zoogodô Bogum Malê Seja Undé, also known as the Roça do Ventura, a terreiro in Cachoeira. The relationship and lineage of the two terreiros remains unclear.

Current status

The land area of the terreiro has changed significantly over time. It has lost major parts of its green areas due to a lack of urban planning in Salvador. The Bogum community has now unable to collect plants required for worship in the terreiro, and the reduction of green spaces also reduces the privacy of Bogum community. It is a problem common to Afro-Brazilian religious centers in Salvador.

As of 2008, Zoogodô Bogum Malê Rundó has approximately 150 members and is actively adding new members. It receives visitors for its festival days; they occur from January first and continue to mid-April.

Lineage

Ludovina Pessoa - founder of the Jejé sect of Candomblé
Mãe Romana de Possú - Gaiaku Romaninha, an initiate of Maria Ogorensi
Luiza Franquelina da Rocha - Gaiaku Luiza - an initiate of Mãe Romaninha
Maria Emiliana Piedade dos Reis - 1935-1950
Mãe Runhó, Valentina Maria dos Anjos Costa, 1960-1975
Mãe Nicinha, Gamo Lokossi - Evangelista dos Anjos Costa, 1978-1994
Mãe Índia, Zaildes Iracema de Mello, 2003–present

Protected status

Zoogodô Bogum Malê Rundó, despite its long history in Salvador, lacks municipal, state, or federal protection. The process of its declaration as a state monument by the Artistic and Cultural Institute of Bahia (IPAC) began in 2022. It remains vulnerable to land speculation due to the dense development of Engenho Velho da Federação. In contrast, Zoogodô Bogum Malê Seja Undé in Cachoeira, the Terreiro of Roca do Ventura, is protected by the Brazilian National Institute of Historic and Artistic Heritage (IPHAN).

References

Engenho Velho da Federação (neighborhood)
Candomblé temples
Religious buildings and structures in Salvador, Bahia
Organisations based in Salvador, Bahia